The Julius Krause Store Building is located in De Pere, Wisconsin.

History
The building was constructed for shoe manufacturer Julius Krause. More recently, the first floor has been used as a photography studio and the second floor has been converted into apartments. The building is on the National Register of Historic Places.

References

Commercial buildings on the National Register of Historic Places in Wisconsin
Industrial buildings and structures on the National Register of Historic Places in Wisconsin
Residential buildings on the National Register of Historic Places in Wisconsin
National Register of Historic Places in Brown County, Wisconsin
Italianate architecture in Wisconsin
Brick buildings and structures
Commercial buildings completed in 1882
Industrial buildings completed in 1882
Shoe business
1882 establishments in Wisconsin